The 1971 Detroit Lions season was their 42nd in the league. The team failed to improve on their previous season's output of 10–4, winning only seven games.

Mired in adversity, the 1971 season turned especially tragic for the Lions and the NFL when, during their Week 6 hosting of the Chicago Bears, Lions wide receiver Chuck Hughes collapsed on the playing field. Unresponsive, Hughes was pronounced dead later that day of heart failure. Since 1971, no Detroit player has worn Hughes' #85 jersey save on special permission of the Hughes family.

Offseason

NFL Draft 

Notes

 Detroit traded QB Greg Barton to Philadelphia in exchange for the Eagles' second-round selection (30th) and second- and third-round selections in 1972.
 Detroit traded DE Denis Moore to Philadelphia in exchange for the Eagles' sixth-round selection (150th).
 Detroit traded its tenth-round selection (256th) to Philadelphia in exchange for DB Len Persin.

Roster

Schedule 

Note: Intra-division opponents are in bold text.

Standings

Season summary

Week 6 

Chuck Hughes became the first NFL player to die on the field during a game.

References 

Detroit Lions seasons
Detroit Lions
Detroit Lions
1971 in Detroit